Sebastião Afonso Viana Macedo Neves, better known as Tião Viana (Rio Branco, February 9, 1961), is a doctor and Brazilian politician. He was formerly Governor of Acre and is a member of the Workers' Party. He served as interim President of the Senate in 2007.

References

External links
  Home page of Tião Viana

1961 births
Living people
Governors of Acre (state)
Members of the Federal Senate (Brazil)
Presidents of the Federal Senate (Brazil)
People from Rio Branco, Acre
20th-century Brazilian physicians
Workers' Party (Brazil) politicians